The 1930 Southern Intercollegiate Athletic Association men's basketball tournament took place February 26–March 1, 1930, at Jackson, MS. The Southwestern Louisiana Bulldogs won their first Southern Intercollegiate Athletic Association title, led by head coach E. J. Pickell.

Bracket

Consolation game

Championship

See also
List of SIAA basketball champions

References

Tournament
Southern Athletic Association Intercollegiate men's basketball tournament
Southern Athletic Association Intercollegiate men's basketball tournament
Southern Athletic Association Intercollegiate men's basketball tournament